Paulo Silva may refer to:

 Giant Silva (Paulo César da Silva, born 1963), Brazilian former basketball player, mixed martial artist and wrestler
 Paulo da Silva (born 1980), Paraguayan football defender
 Paulo Silva (volleyball) (born 1963), Brazilian former volleyball player
 Paulo Emilio Silva (born 1969), Brazilian beach volleyball player
 Paulo Jorge Almeida Silva (born 1992), Portuguese footballer
 Paulo Silva (swimmer), backstroke swimmer from Brazil
 Paulo Silva (soccer) (born 1966), Brazilian footballer and manager
 Paulo Jorge Silva (born 1972), Portuguese football player and coach